Coryphaeschna viriditas, the mangrove darner, is a species of darner in the family Aeshnidae. It is found in the Caribbean, Central America, North America, and South America.

The IUCN conservation status of Coryphaeschna viriditas is "LC", least concern, with no immediate threat to the species' survival. The population is stable.

References

Further reading

External links

 

Aeshnidae
Insects described in 1952